Russian Crimea may refer to:

Republic of Crimea, occupied Ukraine and federal subject of Russia since 2014
Taurida Oblast, province of the Russian Empire from 1784 until 1796
Taurida Governorate, governorate of the Russian Empire from 1802 until 1921
Crimean People's Republic, autonomy of the Russian DFR between 1917 and 1918
Taurida Soviet Socialist Republic, federal subject of the Russian SFSR in 1918
Crimean Autonomous Soviet Socialist Republic, administrative division of the Russian SFSR between 1921 and 1945
Crimean Oblast, province of the Russian SFSR between 1945 and 1954

See also

 Russian (disambiguation)
 Russia (disambiguation)
 Crimea (disambiguation)